Phyllorhiza is a genus of jellyfish in the family Mastigiidae.

Species
The following species are recognized in the genus Phyllorhiza:

Phyllorhiza pacifica (Light, 1921)
Phyllorhiza peronlesueuri Goy, 1990
Phyllorhiza punctata Lendenfeld, 1884

References

Mastigiidae
Scyphozoan genera